Ángel Herrero Morales (1 March 1942 – 12 January 2014) was a Spanish professional footballer who played as a midfielder.

Football career
Born in Zamora, Castile and León, Herrero finished his formation with Real Madrid. He played professionally for UP Langreo, Racing de Santander, CA Ceuta, Rayo Vallecano and Sporting de Gijón in a 12-year senior career, competing mainly in Segunda División.

With Asturias' Sporting, Herrero spent three years in La Liga, sharing teams with namesake José Manuel García Herrero and thus being known as Herrero I. He started playing as a defensive midfielder but spent his later career as a left back, retiring in 1973 at the age of 31.

Later life and death
After retiring, Herrero settled in Gijón with his wife and daughters. He died on 12 January 2014 at the age of 71, from pulmonary edema.

Honours
Sporting Gijón
Segunda División: 1969–70

References

External links

1942 births
2014 deaths
People from Zamora, Spain
Sportspeople from the Province of Zamora
Spanish footballers
Footballers from Castile and León
Association football defenders
Association football midfielders
La Liga players
Segunda División players
Real Madrid Castilla footballers
UP Langreo footballers
Racing de Santander players
Rayo Vallecano players
Sporting de Gijón players
Deaths from pulmonary edema